The Sam Nunn Atlanta Federal Center is the ninth largest federal building in the United States and the largest in the southeast. The building houses 5,000 employees for dozens of federal agencies and combines four distinct structural elements in central downtown, equaling .

The Center is a U-shaped complex consisting of several distinct parts: a 24-story Modernist tower completed in 1997, a ten-story building, and the former main building of Rich's (department store), which opened in 1924. It also includes an eight-story bridge, six stories above Forsyth Street. The 1948 "Crystal Bridge", which connected two Rich's buildings, was demolished during the converting of the site to the Federal building complex, and was replaced by a more substantial connector between the high-rise and the 1924 Rich's building. The architect for the 1996-8 construction was Kohn, Peterson, Fox and Associates.

A tunnel to and from Five Points station is open to employees, and it was formerly a customer tunnel connecting Rich's to the station.

The building is named for Sam Nunn, U.S. senator from Georgia.

References

Government buildings in Georgia (U.S. state)